Liolaemus constanzae, commonly known as Constanza's tree iguana, is a species of lizard in the family Liolaemidae. The species is endemic to South America.

Etymology
The specific name, constanzae, is in honor of Constanza Donoso-Barros, eldest daughter of Roberto Donoso-Barros.

The synonym, Liolaemus donosoi, was named in honor of Roberto Donoso-Barros.

Geographic range
L. constanzae is found in Chile, possibly Argentina (no confirmed records seem to exist), and is expected to be present in Bolivia.

Habitat

Diet
L. constanzae feeds on plants and seeds, and it preys upon small invertebrates.

Reproduction
L. constanzae is oviparous.

References

constanzae
Lizards of South America
Reptiles of Chile
Reptiles of Argentina
Reptiles described in 1961
Taxa named by Roberto Donoso-Barros
Taxonomy articles created by Polbot